Ram Kumari Chaudhary is a Nepali politician and a member of the House of Representatives of the federal parliament of Nepal, as well as the State Minister for Agriculture, Land Management and Cooperatives in the federal government.

She had previously contested the Second Constituent Assembly election in 2013 as a UCPN (Maoist) candidate from Sunsari-2 constituency, but was defeated.

References

Living people
Place of birth missing (living people)
21st-century Nepalese women
People from Sunsari District
21st-century Nepalese politicians
Nepal Communist Party (NCP) politicians
Nepal MPs 2017–2022
Communist Party of Nepal (Maoist Centre)
1985 births